Jason Qareqare (born 26 January 2004) is a professional rugby league footballer who plays as a er or  for Castleford Tigers in the Super League.

Background
Qareqare is of a Fijian background. He lived in Germany for 4 years before his family relocated to Yorkshire.

Qareqare played his junior rugby league for the Kippax Knights. He had previously played football with York City and rugby union in school, until he was inspired to take up the sport by Fiji's run to the 2013 Rugby League World Cup semi-finals as well as due to rugby league's popularity in the area.

Club career

Castleford Tigers
On 10 June 2021, Qareqare made his Super League debut in round 9 of the 2021 season for the Castleford Tigers (Heritage № 1008) against Hull FC, rounding Jake Connor to score a try with his first touch of the ball. This was later voted Castleford's Try of the Year despite strong competition. He went on to make 2 further appearances in 2021.

In Qareqare's first start of the 2022 season on 22 April, he once again scored a long-range try with his first touch of the ball, beating 4 St Helens defenders on the touchline. This was later voted Super League Try of the Month, and in December was voted Super League Try of the Season.

Representative career 
In May 2022, Qareqare was named in Fiji's initial 50-man squad in the build up towards the 2021 Rugby League World Cup. In September 2022, he was included in the extended 33-man training squad. On 7 October 2022, Qareqare made his Fiji debut against England in their warm-up game at the AJ Bell Stadium, although missed out on a final selection in Fiji's 24-man tournament squad.

References

External links
Castleford Tigers profile
SL profile

2004 births
Living people
Castleford Tigers players
Coventry Bears players
English people of I-Taukei Fijian descent
Fiji national rugby league team players
Fijian rugby league players
Rugby league wingers
Whitehaven R.L.F.C. players